Cephenemyiini is a tribe within the family Oestridae which includes large flies, parasitic on deer and related ungulates.

Tribe Cephenemyiini
Genus Cephenemyia Latreille, 1818
C. apicata Bennett and Sabrosky, 1962
C. auribarbis (Meigen, 1824) 
C. grandis
C. jellisoni Townsend, 1941
C. kaplanovi
C. macrostis Brauer, 1863
C. phobifer (Clark, 1815)
C. pratti (Clark, 1815)
C. stimulator Hunter, 1916
C. trompe (Modeer, 1786)
C. ulrichii Brauer, 1863
Genus Pharyngomyia Schiner, 1861
P. picta (Meigen, 1824)

References 

Oestridae
Parasitic flies
Brachycera tribes